The individual dressage at the 2002 FEI World Equestrian Games in Jerez de la Frontera, Spain was held at Estadio Municipal de Chapín from September 10 to September 22, 2002.
Germany's Nadine Capellmann won the gold medal. Beatriz Ferrer-Salat representing Spain won the silver medal and Ulla Salzgeber won bronze.

Competition format

The team and individual dressage competitions used the same results. Dressage had three phases. The first phase was the Grand Prix. The top 30 individuals advanced to the second phase, the Grand Prix Special. The Individual Grand Prix Freestyle was the third phase where the individual medals where given. The best results of the Grand Prix Special and Grand Prix Freestyle counted for the final result.

Germany's Ann-Kathrin Linsenhoff, American Günter Seidel and Dutch Coby van Baalen qualified for the Freestyle, but with a maximum of the best three rider per country, Linsenhoff and Seidel were not allowed to compete in the final. Van Baalen had to withdraw from the Freestyle due an injury of her horse Olympic Ferro.

Judges
The Grand Prix, Grand Prix Special and Grand Prix Freestyle were assessed by five judges. The president of the Ground Jury was Volker Moritz from Germany. The other judges were Mariette Withages from Belgium, Elizabeth McMullen from Canada, Jan Peeters from The Netherlands and Ernst Holz from South Africa.

Schedule

Results
The individual results of dressage during the World Equestrian Games in 2002 were as follow:

References

2002 in equestrian